Marin County Line is the ninth studio album and eleventh album overall by the country rock band the New Riders of the Purple Sage.  Released in 1977, it was their third and final album on the MCA Records label.

Marin County Line was the second of two NRPS studio albums to feature Stephen Love on bass guitar.  Love wrote all of the songs on side one of the LP.  It was also the band's first album with Patrick Shanahan.  Shanahan had recently replaced Spencer Dryden as the New Riders' drummer, and Dryden had become the band's manager.  Love and Shanahan were both former members of Rick Nelson's Stone Canyon Band.  Also in the NRPS lineup for this album were co-founders John "Marmaduke" Dawson and David Nelson, and long-time member Buddy Cage.  A concert performed by this version of the band was released in 2009 as the album Winterland, San Francisco, CA, 12/31/77.

Track listing
Side one
"Till I Met You" (Stephen Love) – 3:23
"Llywelyn" (Love) – 3:59
"Knights and Queens" (Love) – 3:59
"Green Eyes a Flashing" (Love) – 2:54
"Oh, What a Night" (Love) – 3:55
Side two
"A Good Woman Likes to Drink with the Boys" (Dave Ellingson) – 4:12
"Jasper" (John Dawson, David Nelson) – 2:38
"Echoes" (Patrick Shanahan) – 3:04
"Twenty Good Men" (Dawson) – 3:29
"Little Miss Bad" (Dawson) – 2:20
"Take a Red" (Nelson, Spencer Dryden) – 2:25

Personnel

New Riders of the Purple Sage
John Dawson – guitar, harmonica, vocals
David Nelson – guitar, vocals
Buddy Cage – pedal steel guitar
Stephen Love – bass, guitar, vocals
Patrick Shanahan – drums, vibes, percussion, vocals

Additional musicians
Spencer Dryden – percussion
John Hug – guitar
Tom Stern – banjo
Ray Park – fiddle
Tower of Power horn section – horns on "Take a Red"

Production
Jim Ed Norman – producer
Tom Flye – engineer
Steve Fontano – associate engineer
Alex Kashevaroff – assistant engineer
Larry Boden – mastering
George Osaki – art direction
Herb Greene – photography

Notes

New Riders of the Purple Sage albums
1977 albums
Albums produced by Jim Ed Norman
MCA Records albums